UDP-glucose 6-dehydrogenase is a cytosolic enzyme that in humans is encoded by the UGDH gene.

The protein encoded by this gene converts UDP-glucose to UDP-glucuronate and thereby participates in the biosynthesis of glycosaminoglycans such as hyaluronan, chondroitin sulfate, and heparan sulfate. These glycosylated compounds are common components of the extracellular matrix and likely play roles in signal transduction, cell migration, and cancer growth and metastasis. The expression of this gene is up-regulated by transforming growth factor beta and down-regulated by hypoxia.

This enzyme participates in 4 metabolic pathways: pentose and glucuronate interconversions, ascorbate and aldarate metabolism, starch and sucrose metabolism, and nucleotide sugars metabolism.

Loss of UGDH has recently been implicated in epileptic encephalopathy in humans

Nomenclature 

This enzyme belongs to the family of oxidoreductases, specifically those acting on the CH-OH group of donor with NAD+ or NADP+ as acceptor. The systematic name of this enzyme class is UDP-glucose:NAD+ 6-oxidoreductase.

Other names in common use include:
 UDP-glucose dehydrogenase, 
 uridine diphosphoglucose dehydrogenase, 
 UDPG dehydrogenase, 
 UDPG:NAD oxidoreductase, 
 UDP-alpha-D-glucose:NAD oxidoreductase, 
 UDP-glucose:NAD+ oxidoreductase, 
 uridine diphosphate glucose dehydrogenase, 
 UDP-D-glucose dehydrogenase, and 
 uridine diphosphate D-glucose dehydrogenase.

Biochemistry

In enzymology, a UDP-glucose 6-dehydrogenase is an enzyme that catalyzes the chemical reaction

UDP-glucose + 2 NAD+ + H2O  UDP-glucuronate + 2 NADH + 2 H+

The 3 substrates of this enzyme are UDP-glucose, NAD+, and H2O, whereas its 3 products are UDP-glucuronate, NADH, and H+

References:

References

Further reading 

 
 
 
 
 
 
 
 
 
 
 
 

EC 1.1.1
NADH-dependent enzymes
Enzymes of known structure